The hadal zone, also known as the hadopelagic zone, is the deepest region of the ocean, lying within oceanic trenches.

The cumulative area occupied by the 46 individual hadal habitats worldwide is less than 0.25% of the world's seafloor, yet trenches account for over 40% of the ocean's depth range. Most hadal habitat is found in the Pacific Ocean.

Terminology and definition
Historically, the hadal zone was not recognized as distinct from the abyssal zone, although the deepest sections were sometimes called "ultra-abyssal". During the early 1950s, the Danish Galathea II and Soviet Vitjaz expeditions separately discovered a distinct shift in the life at depths of  not recognized by the broad definition of the abyssal zone. The name refers to Hades, the ancient Greek god of the underworld.

These shallower trenches lack the distinct shift in lifeforms and are therefore not hadal. Among others, this intermediate limit has been adopted by UNESCO. Similar to other depth ranges, the fauna of the hadal zone can be broadly placed into two groups: the hadobenthic species (compare benthic) living on or at the seabottom/sides of trenches and the hadopelagic species (compare pelagic) living in the open water.

Ecology

The deepest ocean trenches are considered the least explored and most extreme marine ecosystems. They are characterized by complete lack of sunlight, low temperatures, nutrient scarcity, and extremely high hydrostatic pressures. The major sources of nutrients and carbon are fallout from upper layers, drifts of fine sediment, and landslides. Most organisms are scavengers and detrivores. Over 400 species are currently known from hadal ecosystems, many of which possess physiological adaptations to the extreme environmental conditions. There are high levels of endemism, and noteworthy examples of gigantism in amphipods, mysids, and isopods and dwarfism in  nematodes, copepods, and kinorhynchs.

Marine life decreases with depth, both in abundance and biomass, but there is a wide range of metazoan organisms in the hadal zone, mostly benthos, including fish, sea cucumber, bristle worms, bivalves, isopods, sea anemones, amphipods, copepods, decapod crustaceans and gastropods. Most of these trench communities probably originated from the abyssal plains. Although they have evolved adaptations to high pressure and low temperatures such as lower metabolism, intra-cellular protein-stabilising osmolytes, and unsaturated fatty acids in cell membrane phospholipids, there is no consistent relationship between pressure and metabolic rate in these communities. Increased pressure can instead constrain the ontogenic or larval stages of organisms.

Over a geological time scale, trenches can become accessible as previously stenobathic (limited to a narrow depth range) fauna evolve to become eurybathic (adapted to a wider range of depths), such as grenadiers and natantian prawns. Trench communities do, nevertheless, display a contrasting degree of intra-trench endemism and inter-trench similarities at a higher taxonomic level.

Only a relatively small number of fish species are known from the hadal zone, including certain grenadiers, cutthroat eels, pearlfish, cusk-eels, snailfish and eelpouts. Also giant protists known as Xenophyophora (foraminifera) live at these depths.

Conditions
The only known primary producers in the hadal zone are certain bacteria that are able to metabolize hydrogen and methane released by rock and seawater reactions (serpentinization), or hydrogen sulfide released from cold seeps. Some of these bacteria are symbiotic, for example living inside the mantle of certain thyasirid and vesicomyid bivalves. Otherwise the first link in the hadal food web are heterotroph organisms that feed on marine snow, both fine particles and the occasional carcass.

At such depths, the pressure in the hadal zone exceeds . Lack of light and extreme pressure makes this part of the ocean difficult to explore.

Exploration 
The exploration of the hadal zone requires the use of instruments that are able to withstand pressures of up to a thousand or more atmospheres. A few haphazard and non-standard tools have been used to collect limited, but valuable, information about the basic biology of a few hadal organisms. Manned and unmanned submersibles, however, can be used to study the depths in greater detail. Unmanned robotic submersibles may be remotely operated (connected to the research vessel by a cable) or autonomous (freely moving). Cameras and manipulators on submersibles allow researchers to observe and take samples of sediment and organisms. Failures of submersibles under the immense pressure at hadal zone depths have occurred. HROV Nereus is thought to have imploded at a depth of 9,990 meters while exploring the Kermadec Trench in 2014.

Notable missions

The first manned exploration to reach Challenger Deep, the deepest known part of the ocean located in the Mariana Trench, was accomplished in 1960 by Jacques Piccard and Don Walsh.

James Cameron also reached the bottom of Mariana Trench in March 2012 using the Deepsea Challenger. Cameron holds the record for the deepest solo dive.

Few unmanned submersibles are capable of descending to maximum hadal depths. The deepest diving unmanned submersibles have included the Kaikō (lost at sea in 2003), the ABISMO, the Nereus (lost at sea in 2014), and the Haidou-1.

See also

 
 
 
 
  - A layer that includes shallow waters and coral reefs

References

External links
Forscher filmen lebende Fische in Rekordtiefe (In German) from Spiegel 10/09/2008 about an expedition filming fish at a depth of more than 7,000 m

Hydrology
Oceanographical terminology
Extreme points of Earth
1950s neologisms